Traditional witchcraft is a term used by certain esotericists who regard their practices as forms of witchcraft. The unifying feature of these religious movements is the attempt to differentiate themselves from the modern Pagan new religious movement of Wicca, whose followers typically call themselves witches, by emphasising "traditional" roots. Among traditions that have repeatedly been termed "traditional witchcraft" are Victor Henry Anderson's Feri Tradition, Robert Cochrane's Cochrane's Craft and Andrew D. Chumbley's Sabbatic Craft. 

In the 1950s, the British esotericist Gerald Gardner began promoting a form of Wicca later termed Gardnerian Wicca. This provided the basis for later traditions of Wicca, such as Alexandrian Wicca and Dianic Wicca. Over the following decades, other esotericists promoted traditions in which participants call their practices witchcraft. Many of these sought to differentiate themselves from Wicca by using the term "Traditional witchcraft". Some of these engaged in modern Pagan religions similar to Wicca; others, like the Sabbatic Craft, followed Luciferianism.

Definitions
Historian Ethan Doyle White described traditional witchcraft as "a broad movement of aligned magico-religious groups who reject any relation to Gardnerianism and the wider Wiccan movement, claiming older, more "traditional" roots. Although typically united by a shared aesthetic rooted in European folklore, the Traditional Craft contains within its ranks a rich and varied array of occult groups, from those who follow a contemporary Pagan path that is suspiciously similar to Wicca to those who adhere to Luciferianism".

Several self-described "traditional witches" have also provided definitions. The British occultist Michael Howard, a member of the Cultus Sabbati, used the term to describe "any non-Gardnerian, non-Alexandrian, non-Wiccan or pre-modern form of the Craft, especially if it has been inspired by historical forms of witchcraft and folk magic". Another definition was offered by Daniel A. Schulke, the current Magister of the Cultus Sabbati, when he proclaimed that traditional witchcraft "refers to a coterie of initiatory lineages of ritual magic, spellcraft and devotional mysticism".

Some forms of traditional witchcraft are the Feri Tradition, Cochrane's Craft and the Sabbatic craft.

In 1981, three pseudonymous authors published Wicca: The Ancient Way, in which they used traditional witchcraft to refer to Gardnerian Wicca.

Cochrane's Craft 
Cochrane's Craft, which is also known as Cochranianism, was founded in 1951 by the English Witch Robert Cochrane, who himself claimed to have been taught it by some of his elderly family members, a claim that is disputed by some historians such as Ronald Hutton and Leo Ruickbie.

Cochranianism revolved around the veneration of the Horned God and the Mother Goddess, alongside seven polytheistic deities which are viewed as children of the God and Goddess. Cochranian Witchcraft has several features that separate it from other traditions such as Gardnerian Wicca, such as its emphasis on mysticism and philosophy, and Cochrane's attitude that it was not pagan, but only based upon paganism.

Feri Tradition 
The Feri Tradition (not to be confused with Faery, Fairy, Faerie, or Vicia, which are different traditions) is an ecstatic (rather than fertility) tradition stemming from the experience of Cora and Victor Anderson. Strong emphasis is placed on sensual experience and awareness, including sexual mysticism, which is not limited to heterosexual expression. The Feri Tradition has very diverse influences, such as Huna, Vodou, Faery lore, Kabbalah, Hoodoo, Tantra, and Gnosticism.

Among the distinguishing features of the Feri tradition is the use of a specific Feri power or energetic current. Feri witches often see themselves as "fey": outside social definitions and intentionally living within paradox. They believe that much of reality is unseen, or at least has uncertain boundaries. Within the tradition there is a deep respect for the wisdom of nature, a love of beauty, and an appreciation of bardic and mantic creativity.

Core teachings acknowledged by most branches of the tradition include the concepts of the Three Souls and the Black Heart of Innocence, the tools of the Iron and Pearl Pentacle (now commonly also used by Reclaiming (Neopaganism)), as well as an awareness of "energy ecology", which admonishes practitioners to never give away or waste their personal power. Trance experiences and personal connection to the Divine are at the heart of this path, leading to a wide variety of practices throughout the larger body of the tradition.

Scholars of Paganism like Joanne Pearson and Ethan Doyle White have characterised Feri as a Wiccan tradition. The latter noted however that some modern Pagans restrict the term Wicca to British Traditional Wicca, in which case Feri would not be classified as Wicca; he deemed this exclusionary definition of the term to be "unsuitable for academic purposes". Instead, he characterised Feri as one form of Wicca which is nevertheless distinct from others, such as British Traditional Wicca, Dianic Wicca, and Stregheria.

Sabbatic craft 

Sabbatic craft, a term coined by Andrew D. Chumbley, is described as "an initiatory line of spirit-power that can inform all who are receptive to its impetus, and whichwhen engaged with beyond namesmay be understood as a Key unto the Hidden Design of Arte." Chumbley sometimes referred to the Nameless Faith, Crooked Path, and Via Tortuosa. He reserved "Sabbatic Craft" as a unifying term to refer to the "convergent lineages" of the "Cultus Sabbati," a body of traditional witchcraft initiates.

Chumbley's works and those of Daniel Schulke on the Cultus Sabbati's "ongoing tradition of sorcerous wisdom" continue to serve as the prototypical reference works. The craft is not an ancient, pre-Christian tradition surviving into the modern age. It is a tradition rooted in "cunning-craft," a patchwork of older magical practice and later Christian mythology.

In his grimoire Azoëtia, Chumbley incorporated diverse iconography from ancient Sumerian, ancient Egyptian, Yezidi, and Aztec cultures. He spoke of a patchwork of ancestral and tutelary spirit folklore which he perceived amidst diverse "Old Craft" traditions in Britain as "a gnostic faith in the Divine Serpent of Light, in the Host of the Gregori, in the Children of Earth sired by the Watchers, in the lineage of descent via Lilith, Mahazael, Cain, Tubal-cain, Naamah, and the Clans of the Wanderers." Schulke believed that folk and cunning-crafts of Britain absorbed multicultural elements from "Freemasonry, Bible divination, Romany charms, and other diverse streams," what Chumbley called "dual-faith observance," referring to a "co-mingling of ‘native’ forms of British magic and Christianity".

References

Bibliography

Further reading
 Morgan, Lee (2013). A Deed Without a Name: Unearthing the Legacy of Traditional Witchcraft. Moon Books
 De Mattos Frisvold, Nicholaj (2014). Craft of the Untamed: An Inspired Vision of Traditional Witchcraft. Mandrake
 diGregorio, Sophia (2012). What's Next After Wicca? Non-Wiccan Occult Practices and Traditional Witchcraft. Winter Tempest Books
 Gary, Gemma (2011). Traditional Witchcraft: A Cornish Book of Ways. Troy Books
 Huson, Paul (1970). Mastering Witchcraft: A Practical Guide for Witches, Warlocks, and Covens

Witchcraft
Etymologies
Western esotericism